Amblyseius raoiellus is a species of mite in the family Phytoseiidae.

References

raoiellus
Articles created by Qbugbot
Animals described in 1989